Happy Family is an American sitcom television series created by Moses Port and David Guarascio, that aired on NBC from September 9, 2003, until April 20, 2004.

Premise
John Larroquette and Christine Baranski star as Peter and Annie Brennan, soon-to-be empty nesters who could not be happier about it. But when their youngest son Tim (Tyler Andrews aka Tyler Francavilla) flunks out of community college, Peter and Annie cannot escape the duties of parenthood. Their eldest son, Todd (Jeff Bryan Davis) decides to dump his fiancée only days before the wedding. Their daughter Sara (Melanie Paxson), while having a successful career, cannot find or keep a man and instead socializes with her parrot. If that isn't enough, after Tim drops out of college he moves in with Maggie, a divorced middle-aged family friend and neighbor, and announces that they are dating. Peter and Annie are constantly trying to find time without the kids and their problems, but while trying to maintain a happy family image, they end up involved with their kids more than ever.

The show ran for one complete season on Tuesdays at 8:30pm on NBC. However, the ratings were not up to NBC's standards and the show was not renewed for the following season.

Cast
John Larroquette as Peter Brennan
Christine Baranski as Annie Brennan
Susan Gibney as Maggie Harris
Tyler Andrews as Tim Brennan
Melanie Paxson as Sara Brennan
Jeff Bryan Davis as Todd Brennan

Episodes
Every episode of the series was directed by Pamela Fryman.

References

External links 
 

2000s American sitcoms
2003 American television series debuts
2004 American television series endings
NBC original programming
Television series by Universal Television
Television shows set in Philadelphia